S. William A. Gunn is a Canadian surgeon, author, involved with various international health organizations. 

Sisvan William Aram Gunn (SWA) was born on February 10, 1926, in Vancouver, Canada (or British Cyprus). Gunn completed his medical studies in Geneva.

Prior to joining the World Health Organization, Gunn was a lecturer in History of
Medicine and Science at the University of British Columbia in Vancouver.
Formerly head of Emergency Relief Operations of the WHO.
Later, Scientific director vice president of the European Center for Disaster Medicine; founder and president of the Medical Society of the World Health Organization 
and president of the board of the International Association for Humanitarian Medicine (IAHM).

Gunn has authored, co-authored
over 300 professional publications and 20 mono-graphs.

Gunn was awarded the honorary doctorate of Palermo University.

References 

Living people
1926 births
World Health Organization officials